Estrella Sailport  is a privately owned public-use glider airport located  west of the central business district of Maricopa, in Pinal County, Arizona, United States.

Facilities and aircraft 
It has four runways:
 6R/24L is 2,520 by 30 feet (768 x 9 m) with an asphalt surface;
 6C/24C is 1,995 by 25 feet (608 x 8 m) with a dirt surface;
 6L/24R is 1,910 by 25 feet (582 x 8 m) with a dirt surface;
 7/25 is 3,740 by 20 feet (1,140 x 6 m) with a dirt surface.

For the 12-month period ending April 24, 2011, the airport had 20,000 general aviation aircraft operations, an average of 54 per day. At that time there were 42 aircraft based at this airport: 95% glider and 5% single-engine.

References

External links 
 Estrella Sailport at Arizona DOT airport directory
 Arizona Soaring, Inc. at Estrella Sailport
 Aerial image as of 28 September 1996 from USGS The National Map

Airports in Pinal County, Arizona
Gliderports in the United States